The long-nosed short-tailed opossum (Monodelphis scalops), is an opossum species in Argentina and Brazil.

References

Opossums
Marsupials of South America
Mammals of Argentina
Mammals of Brazil
Mammals described in 1888
Taxa named by Oldfield Thomas